Thomas Revell Shivers  (1751 – 1 June 1827) was a Royal Navy officer in the 18th/19th century who rose to be Vice Admiral.

Life and career
He was born in Wickham, Hampshire in 1751. His early career in the Royal Navy is not clear. He appears in the Royal Navy in May 1777 (aged 26) as a Lieutenant in command of the schooner  at Newfoundland.

In August 1778, he replaced Lt Howell Lloyd in command of the 10-gun . On 3 November, a storm in the Bay of Bulls off the Newfoundland coast wrecked Penguin. The armed brig Portillion was lost in the same storm. In January 1779 he was court martialled by Captain Nicholas Vincent on behalf of Admiral Robert Linzee regarding the loss of HMS Penguin. Following this he was placed on shore leave for 3 years.

He sailed her to the Leeward Islands.

In May 1789, he was given command of the 18 gun . On 21 September 1790 he was promoted to post captain and given command of the 32-gun , a non-active post prior to her being paid off.

From 1794 to 1797, he had another long period of shore leave before taking command of the recently captured Dutch ship  in March 1797. After a further year of shore leave he took his final active command on the 74-gun  in February 1799 plying the south English coast.

Shivers retired from active duty in December 1800. He was promoted several times thereafter ending at the rank of Vice Admiral.

Shivers died at Wickham on 1 June 1827, and was buried there in St Nicholas' Church on 8 June.

Family
His wife Mary South died at Havelock House in Wickham in 1846.

He was uncle (through marriage) to James Buchanan Macaulay.

References
 

1751 births
1827 deaths
Military personnel from Hampshire
British admirals
People who were court-martialed
Burials in Hampshire